Ljubov Zinovjevna Sova (Russian: Любовь Зиновьевна Сова) (Aksenova since 1979) is a Russian philologist notable for contributions in the field of linguistics and orientalistics. Her main fields of professional interest include linguistics, African philology, semiotics, typology, Slavic languages and journalism.

Education

Sova was born in 1937 in Kharkov in what was then Soviet Ukraine. 
She recvied her BA in English language from the Kharkov State Courses for Foreign Languages (1958).
She received her MA in philology (Russian language and literature) from the Karazin Kharkiv National University (1960).
MA in mathematics from the Saint Petersburg State University (1969).
PhD in philological science (structural linguistics and African languages) from the Higher Attestation Commission of the USSR (1965); where her thesis was entitled Verb Classes in the Zulu Language.
She received her D. Habilitatus and D.Phil. from the Higher Attestation Commission of the USSR (1977) with a thesis entitled Analytical Linguistics

She received academic honors from the Higher Attestation Commission of the USSR and the Academy of Sciences of the USSR in recognition of achievements in comparative and historic linguistics and typology (1984).

Career
Sova has worked progressively as an assistant professor, full professor and leading full professor at the Leningrad Branch of the Linguistic Institute of the Academy of Sciences of the USSR from 1964 to 1990. Since 1990, she has worked as a writer and journalist, and has been editor of the Berlin journal Good Evening! since 1997.  She has also continued to work in academia as a visiting professor at various colleges and universities in Berlin.

Research
Sova's main areas of experience and expertise include analytical linguistics, African philology, Russian language and literature, Slavic languages, semiotics, general, historical, typologic and computational linguistics, syntax, semantics, philosophy and journalism. Sova was among the first researchers to apply computer analysis to the area of philology, and in her D. Habil. thesis, created a theory that she termed "Analytical Linguistics" to apply techniques of constructive mathematics to linguistic materials.  Her work has been described as "extending the aims of the generative grammars, [to] set its aim to describe the apparatus of extracted axioms"  and was a key factor in the reconstruction of the Proto-Bantu language and the description of the evolution of the Bantu languages.

Publications
Sova is the author of 200 published and unpublished works, two novels and thirteen scientific monographs, including:

Scientific monographs
Analytical Linguistics (In English). St. Petersburg. 2012. 370 p.
Africanistics and Evolutional Linguistics (In Russian). St. Petersburg. 2008. 397 p.
Studies in Zulu (In Russian). St. Petersburg. 2008. 226 p.
Analytical Linguistics and Typology (In Russian). St. Petersburg. 2007. 378 p.
Linguistics of Synthesis (In Russian). St. Petersburg. 2007. 420 p.
At the Dawn of Language and Thinking. The Origin of African Languages (In Russian). St. Petersburg. 1996. 384 p.
Comparative Grammar of the Bantu Languages (The System of Noun Classes) (In Russian). 480 p. (In manuscript).
Morphology of the Zulu Language (In Russian). 400 p. (In manuscript).
Referential Classification of the Russian Nouns (In Russian). 600 p. (In manuscript).
Bantu Grammatical Structure Evolution (in Russian). Leningrad. 1987. 360 p.
Analytical Linguistics (In Russian). Moscow. 1970. 255 p.
Zulu Configurational Syntax. In 2 parts (in Russian). Leningrad. Part 1. 1968. 209 p.; Part 2. 1969. 299 p.
The Verb Classes in the Zulu Language (In Russian). Leningrad: Nauka, 1965, 15 p. (Doctoral dissertation abstract). Unpublished doctoral dissertation (In Russian) in two volumes: V. 1. 521 p. V. 2. 497 p.

Novels and stories (selected)
Our People in Berlin (In Russian). St. Petersburg. 2004. 188 p.
Eurofall (In Russian) (together with E. Vertel). 1st ed. Journal "Neva". N 11. 2003. 2nd ed. St. Petersburg. 2004. 178 p. 3rd ed. RJ.
Ich, Albert Eistein... (In German) //Neue Literatur. Anthologie im Herbst 2004. Frankfurt A/M. 2004. S. 11-18.
Berlin Stories. 1997–1999 (In Russian). Berlin. 2001. 56 p.
In the Next World. (In Russian). 1st ed. in: Guten Abend! N. 1-6. Berlin, 1996–1999. 2nd ed. St. Petersburg. Publishing House "Neva". 2000. 340 p. 3rd ed. Altaspera Publishing & Literary Agency. Huntsville, Ontario, Canada. 2012, 242 p.
The Sounds and Letters. A Book for Children. 24 p. (In manuscript).

Scientific articles (selected)

"The Synchrony and Diachrony of Speech Activity in Analytical Linguistics"(In Russian). Varietas Delectans. The Collection of Articles Devoted to the 70th Years since the Birth of N. L. Sukhachov. St. Petersburg. 2012. P. 457–501.
The Specifics of Language Processes in the Bantu Languages (In Russian) // Albanic Philology, Balcanistics, Problems of Linguistics. The Materials of Conference, Devoted to the 100th Years since the Birth of A. V. Desnickaya, 27-30. 09. 2012. St.-Petersburg, p. 87–89.
"The Evolution of Grammatical Structure in the Languages of Different Types"(In Russian) // Structural and Applied Linguistics 9. St. Petersburg. 2010. p. 46–59.
The Theory by V. G. Admoni about the Ways of the Language Development (In Russian) // Scientific Legacy of V. G. Admoni and Contemporary Linguistics. The Materials of Conference, Devoted to the 100th Years since the Birth of V. G. Admoni (9-13.11.2009). St.-Petersburg, 2009, p. 20–21.
"The Parts of Speech and Parts of a Sentence in Analytical Linguistics"(In Russian) // The Structural and Applied Linguistics 8. St. Petersburg. 2008. p. 32–49.
"Evolution of Nominal Categories in the Languages of Different Structures" // Indoiranian Linguistics and Typology of Language Situations. The Collection of Articles Devoted to the 75th Years since the Birth of A. L. Grunberg (In Russian). St-Petersburg, 2006, p. 421–430.
"Problems in the 21st Century" (In Russian) // Structural and Applied Linguistics 6, St. Petersburg, 2004, p. 19–38.
"The Orthographic Reform in BDR" (In Russian) // The Materials of Conference, Devoted to the 90th Years since the Birth of A. V. Desnickaya. St. Petersburg, 2002, p. 203–209.
"Approaches to the Model of Verbal Thinking (In English)" // Abhandlungen der wissenschaftlichen Gesellschaft bei der ZWST und Jüdischen Gemeinde zu Berlin. Band 2. Berlin, 1999, p. 112-115.
"The Reform of Orthography in Germany" (In Russian) // «Russkij Berlin - Russkaja Germanija», 179/47, 1999, Appendix «Chto i Kak», p. 7, 11.
"In the Deep of «Tikhij Don» of M. A. Sholokhov" (In Russian) // Guten Abend! (DV), 4(2), 1998, p. 28-44.
"The Authorship of the «Quiet Don»" (together with Je. Vertel) // «Spiegel der Geheimnisse» (In Russian: «Zerkalo Zagadok»), 6, Berlin, 1997, p. 42-44.
«Concerning Scandinavian Version of the «Quiet Don»" (together with Je. Vertel) (In Russian) // The Miracles and Mysteries of «Quiet Don», t. 1. Samara, 1996, p. 183-194.
"The Cosmogonical Lexics of the Peoples of Tropical Africa (In Russian) // «Ethnolinguistical Researches. Ethnic Contacts and Language Changes». St. Petersburg, 1995, p. 203-232.
"Zur Autorschaft des «Stillen Don»"(together with Je. Vertel) (In German) // Zeitschrift für Slawistik, 37, 1992, 4, p. 552-572.
"Concerning the Authorship of the "Quiet Don""(together with Je. Vertel) (In Russian) // Voprosy literatury (Problems of literature), N 2, Moscow, 1991, p. 68-81.
"The Synchrony and Diachrony of the Bantu Languages" (In Russian) // Actual Problems of Comparative Linguistics. Leningrad: Nauka,1989, p. 203-238.
"The Analysis and Synthesis of the Grammatical Categories by a Computer" (In Russian) // Language and Logical Theory. Moscow, 1987, p. 62-73.
«The Computerizing Fund of Russian and Personal Computers» (together with Je. Vertel) (In Russian) // Summaries of the 2nd Conference on Computerizing Fund of Russian. Moscow, 1986, p. 37-39.
«The Principles of the Selection of Texts for Illustrative Fund of Russian» (together with Je. Vertel) (In Russian) // Summaries of the 2nd Conference of Computerizing Fund of Russian. Moscow, 1986, p. 3.
«The Antinomies in Constructing the Computerizing Fund of Russian» (In Russian) // Computerizing Fund of Russian. Ideas and opinions. Moscow: Nauka, 1986, p. 217-220.
A Review on "Le dictionnaire comorien-français et français-comorien du R. P. Sacleux" by M. A. Chamanga and N. - J. Gueunier (SELAF, Paris, 1979) (together with D. Olderogge) (In Russian) // Problems of Linguistics, 1982, 1, p. 139-141.
«Micro- and Macro-structural Analysis in Morphology and Syntax» (In Russian) // Archiv Orientální, 1980, 48, no. 3, p. 217-240.
«Linguistics as a Branch of Semiotics" (In English) // A semiotic landscape. Ed. by S. Chatman, U. Eco, J. - M. Klinkenberg. Approaches to Semiotics 29. The Hague: Mouton, 1979, p. 407-411.
«The Methods of Language Description» (In Russian) // Romance and German Linguistics, issue 1. Minsk, 1978, p. 106-110.
«The Limits and Possibilities of Typology» (In Russian) // Studies of Linguistic Typology. Acta Universitatis Carolinae. Philologica 5. Linguistica generalia. Praha: Univerzita Karlova, 1977, p. 67-82.
«Some Theoretical Problems of Computational Linguistics» (In English) // Computational and Mathematical Linguistics. Pisa, 1977, p. 695-703.
«The Functional Model of Linguistic Intuition» (In Russian) // Modeling of Informational Processes of Purposeful Behavior. The Summaries of Symposium. Tbilisi, 1976, p. 533-535.
«Static and Dynamic Approaches to the Problem of the Linguistic Universalia» (In Russian) // Abstracts of Papers for the Conference in Syntactic Semantics. Moscow, 1976, p. 237-238.
«Linguistics and Computers» (together with W. Morosenko) (In Russian) // The Herald of Higher Educational Institutions, 4, p. 25-28.
«Referential Classification of Russian Nouns» (together with T. Zujewa) (In Russian) // Linguistic Papers of the Leningrad Branch of the Institute of Linguistics of the Academy of Sciences of the USSR, 1976, issue 3, p. 126-140.
«Linguistics as a Branch of Semiotics» (In Russian) // Automatic Analysis of the Texts. Minsk, 1976, p. 6-13.
«The Automatic Recognition of Semantic Connections in Russian» (In Russian) // The Methods of the Analysis of the Texts. Minsk, 1975, p. 128-139.
«Aspects of Deep Structure» (In English) // Proceedings of the 11th International Congress of Linguists, t. 2. Bologna - Florence, Aug. 28 – Sept. 2, 1972. Ed. By Luigi Heilmann: Societa editrice il Mulino Bologna, 1975, p. 507-510.
«Aspects of Deep Structure» (In Russian) // The Theoretical Problems of the Syntax of the Indo-European Languages. Leningrad: Nauka, 1975, p. 56-60.
«The Notion of the Syntactic Structure in the Contemporary Linguistics» (In Russian) // The Materials of the Seminar on the Theoretical Problems of Syntax. Perm, 1975, p. 60-63.
«The Category of Case in the Zulu Language» (In Russian) // The Actual Problems of the Development of the Languages and the Literatures of Africa. Leningrad, 1975, p. 34.
«The Localization of the Events in Time and Space of the Zulu Tales» (In Russian) // The Actual Problems of the Development of the Languages and the Literatures of Africa. Leningrad, 1975, p. 35-36.
«The Hierarchy of the Grammatical Categories under the Constructing the Theory of Voice» (In Russian) // The Peoples of Asia and Africa. Moscow, 1975, p. 81-85.
«Linguistics and Modeling of the Process of Cognition» (In Russian) // Romance and German Linguistics, 5. Minsk, 1975, p. 181-185.
«The Mathematical Methods in the Theory of Cognition» (In Russian) // The Problems of General and Applied Linguistics. Moscow, 1975, p. 8-27.
«The Epistemological and Methodological Problems of Structural Linguistics» (In Russian) // The structure of the Sentence and the Classes of the Words in the Romanian and German Languages, 3. Kalinin, 1974, p. 5-21.
«The Method á priori and á posteriori for Constructing the Linguistic Definitions» (In Russian) // The Structure of the Sentence and the Classes of the Words in the Romanian and German Languages, 3. Kalinin, 1974, p. 185-189.
«The Text as the Result of the Verbal Reflection of the Reality» (In Russian) // The Linguistics of Text. The Materials of the Scientific Conference, part 2. Moscow, 1974, p. 66-72.
«A Structural-syntagmatic Invariant» (In English) // Linguistics, 1974, 125, p. 73-89.
«The Formalization of Semantics» (In Russian) // The Linguistic Security of the Automatic Systems of Governing and Automatic Retrieval of Information. Makhachkala, 1974, p. 110-114.
«The Unification of the Thesaurus of Different Branches by a Computer» (together with V. Motyljow, R. Piotrowskij, W. Shabes) (In Russian) // The Linguistic Security of the Automatic Systems of Governing and Automatic Retrieval of Information. Makhachkala, 1974, p. 10-12.
«The Automatic Recognition of the Semantic Phenomena in Syntax» (In Russian) // Statistics of Language and Automatic Analysis of Text 1974. Leningrad: Nauka, 1974, p. 66-93.
«The Mechanism Generating the Syntactic Conceptions» (In Russian) // Statistics of Language and Automatic Analysis of Text 1974. Leningrad: Nauka, 1974, p. 401-404.
«The Deep Structure and the Invariant of Translation» (In Russian) // The Structure of Sentence and Classes of the Words in the Romanian and German Languages, issue 2, Kalinin, 1974, p. 301-303.
«The Correlation of Form and Meaning in Syntagmatics» (In Russian) // The Structure of Sentence and Classes of the Words in the Romanian and German Languages, issue 2, Kalinin, 1974, p. 19-33.
"The Principles of Linguistic Constructivism" (In Russian) // The Linguistic Statistics and Automatic Analysis of Texts. Minsk, 1974, p. 20-40.
"Some Theoretical Problems of Computational Linguistics" (In English) // Computational and Mathematical Linguistics. Proceedings of the International Conference on Computational Linguistics. Piza: Leo S.OIschki Editore-Firenze-MCMLXXVII, 1974, p. 695-703.
"The Ideophones in the Zulu Language" (In Russian) // The Main Problems of African Philology. Moscow: Nauka, 1973, p. 372-378.
"Induction and Deduction in Constructing of the Linguistic Theory (In Russian) // The theory of Language and Computational Linguistics. Leningrad, 1973, p. 121-133.
"The Formal Connections in Russian (the Definitions)" (In Russian) // The Problems of Structural Linguistics. Moscow: Nauka, 1973, p. 527-542.
Chronicle Notes (together with A. Liberman) (In Russian) // Problems of Linguistics, 1972, 3, p. 156-159.
"The Connection between Subject and Predicate in the Zulu Language" (In Russian) // Africana IX. Leningrad: Nauka 1972, p. 160-180.
"Dualism of Syntactic Structure" (In Russian) // The Structure of Sentence and Classes of the Words in the Romanian and German languages, 1. Kalinin, 1972, p. 9-28.
"Some Antinomies Connecting to the Problem Language - Speech"(In Russian) // The Structure of Sentence and Classes of the Words in the Romanian and German languages, 1. Kalinin, 1971, p. 224-230.
"The Functions of the Suffix -isa in the Zulu Language" (In Russian) // Africana VII. Leningrad: Nauka, 1971 p. 127-150.
"The Structural-and-syntagmatic Invariant" (In English) // Acta Linguistica, 1971, XXI, 3-4, p. 267-281.
"Typology and Semiotics"(In English) // Actes du X-e Congrés International des Linguistes, Bucarest, 28 Aout - 2 Septembre 1967, v. 3. Bucarest: Editions de l’Académie de la République socialista de Roumanie, 1970, p. 557-563.
"ls a Set of Typological Definitions a System?" (In English) // Theoretical Problems of Typology and the Northern Eurasian Languages. Budapest: Akademiai Kiado, p. 93-94.
«Versuch einer Klassifikation der Sprachen auf der Grundlage von Typen binärer Wortverbindungen» (In German) // Linguistics, 1969, 53, Haage, p. 93-99.
"The Valence and Transitivity from the Point of View of the Linguistic Dualism"(In Russian) // The Language Universalia and the Linguistic Typology. Moscow: Nauka, 1969, p. 244-250.
"Typology and Semiotics (In English) // Resumes des communications (X-eme Congrés International des Linguistes). Bucarest: Comité d’Organisation, 1967, p. 345.
"Semiology and Linguistics (In Russian) // The Language as the Sign System of Special Type. Moscow, 1967, p. 69-72.
"The Dualism of Linguistic Signs"(In Russian) // The Peoples of Asia and Africa, 6, Moscow, 1966.
"Semiotics and Typology"(In Russian) // The Conference on Problems of Universal and Areal Characteristics of Languages. Abstracts. Moscow, 1966, p. 69-74.
"The Language Intuition and the Form - Meaning"(In Russian) // Important Problems of Language Evolution. Samarkand, 1966, p. 186-190.
"The Defective Verbs in the Zulu Language" (In Russian) // The Peoples of Asia and Africa, 1966, 4, p. 184-194.
"The Correlation of the Language Subsystems to the Speech ones"(In Russian) // The Languages of Africa. Moscow: Nauka, 1966, p. 205-218.
"The Correlation of the Linguistic Subsystems” (together with V. Khrakovskij) (In Russian) // The Linguistic Typology and the Oriental Languages. Moscow: Nauka, 1965 p. 235-238.
"The Approaches to the Classification of the Languages on the basis of the Types of Binary Word-Clusters" (In Russian) // The Linguistic Typology and the Oriental Languages. Moscow: Nauka, 1965, p. 229-234.
"The Causative Transformation as the Tool for Typologic Classification of the Languages" (In Russian) // The Conference on Typology of the Oriental Languages. Moscow, 1963, p. 82.
"The Syntactic Synonyms in the Machine Translation" (In Russian) // The Papers of the Conference in the Automatic Treatment of Information. Moscow, 1961, p. 1-16.

References

External links
    iling.spb.ru/pdf/liudi/sova/aksenova.html - L. Z. Sova in the Institute of the Linguistic Studies of the Russian Academy of Sciences
    unicat.nlb.by/opac/pls/dict.dic_tst_first? ... 

http://libros.am/.../modelorovanie-r...myslitelnykx-aktov
www.tmnlib.ru.82/ ... /irbis32r/cgiirbis_32.exe?..
iling.spb.ru/comparativ/persona/sova/al_translation.pdf - L. Z. Sova. Analytical Linguistics. St.Petersburg. 2012.
rutracker.org/forum/viewtopic.php?t=3565994 - L. Z. Sova. Analytical Linguistics and Typology. In Russian. St.Petersburg. 2007.
unicat.nlb.by/opac/pls/!search.http_keyword? ... - L. Z. Sova. African and Evolutional Linguistics. In Russian. St.Petersburg. 2008.
www.twirpx.com/file/875353 - L. Z. Sova. Linguistics of Synthesis. In Russian. St.Petersburg. 2007.
www.alib.ru/5_sova_l_z_u_isto ... f4aa56ae3d32f.html - L. Z. Sova. At the Down of Language and Thinking. Genesis of African Languages. In Russian. St.Petersburg. 1996.
www.biblus.ru/Default.aspx?book=4q3887e8 - L. Z. Sova. The Evolution of Grammatical Structure of the Bantu Languages. In Russian. Leningrad. 1987.
www.alib.ru/bs.php4?. - L. Z. Sova. The Configurational Syntax of the Zulu Language. In Russian. Leningrad. 1968–1969.

1937 births
Living people
Linguists from Russia
Russian orientalists
Russian Africanists
Academics from Saint Petersburg
National University of Kharkiv alumni
Women linguists
Women orientalists
20th-century linguists
21st-century linguists